Guylaine Maroist is a Canadian journalist, filmmaker, musician, scriptwriter and film director. She is well known for her documentary productions such as Gentilly or Not To Be, Time Bombs, The Disunited States of Canada, and God Save Justin Trudeau. In 2011 she received the Governor General's History Award for Popular History (The Pierre Berton Award) for her TV documentary series J’ai la mémoire qui tourne (My Memories On a Roll). She is President of Productions de la Ruelle, a documentary film production company in Montreal, and President of Les Artistes pour la Paix, a Quebec NGO advocating peace and nuclear disarmament.

Biography
Guylaine Maroist has a DEC degree in Communications from College Jean-de-Brébeuf, a BAC in Arts from Université de Montreal, and a Certificate in Law from Université de Montreal. After graduation, Maroist worked as a music columnist for Le Devoir from 1992 to 1995, specializing in modern music. During that period, she also wrote for various magazines like The Artist (which she was the editor of in 1993) and Vamp. She freelanced for La Presse and Journal de Montreal on various topics.

In 1994, Maroist started working in the music industry and became deeply interested in Quebec's musical heritage. She and Denis Pantis of Discs Merit, Quebec's musical heritage archivist, created the definitive catalog of Quebec music records by the reissue of a hundred albums of major Quebec stars from 1950 to 1980.

In 1999-2001, Maroist led a major project to create a series of biographies of the best Quebec artists. For 70 musicographies in the creation of which she participated as researcher and director, she took nearly 2000 interviews, making it the largest research effort in the Quebec popular music industry. As a reviewer put it, "from now on, music finally takes the upper hand, in a radical departure from long novels and sensationalist bios."

Productions de la ruelle
The year 2002 marked a turning point in Maroist's career when she founded, with Éric Ruel, Les Productions de la Ruelle, a company specializing in the production of TV series and documentary films. In 2005, they produced a documentary titled Time Bombs, which won the Gold Ribbon Award from the Canadian Association of Broadcasters for the best documentary of the year, and the Grand Jury Prize for Best Documentary at the Independent Film Festival of New York. The film revealed the truth about Canadian soldiers sent in 1957 to the US to participate in military exercises involving the use of nuclear weapons. The soldiers were exposed to prohibitive doses of radiation without being told about the effect, and for decades afterwards, the Canadian government continued to cover up the circumstances of the incident. Relying on the unique footage obtained from US Army archives, as well as on testimonies of the surviving Canadian veterans, Time Bombs had a great effect on public opinion, enabling the veterans to make their case public and compelling the Canadian government to admit the facts and compensate the victims for the damage to their health.

Having discovered the genre of documentary film-making as "a place of great freedom", as she put it, Maroist devoted herself to this new creative pursuit. 2012 saw the production of the documentary Gentilly or Not To Be, focused on the problems with the refurbishment of the Gentilly-2 nuclear power plant in Quebec. The documentary raised questions about the safety of the plant, its nuclear waste and, in particular, the potential negative impact on the health of citizens of the region, asking whether it was better to go ahead with the refurbishment of Gentilly-2, or to take the opportunity to turn to alternative energy sources. According to Tom Mulcair of the NDP and Pauline Maroist, Quebec Premier at the time, the documentary played a decisive role in the mobilization of public opinion against the refurbishment project, leading to its ultimate cancellation. Also in 2012 Les Productions de la Ruelle released The Disunited States of Canada – a documentary exploring the issue of separatism in Canada outside of Quebec. Within a month, the film was watched on line by 120,000 people. In 2013, these two documentaries won three Gemini Awards.

In 2009-10, Maroist and Eric Ruel accomplished a major multimedia film project devoted to Quebec history, based on thousands family movies collected from Quebecers. The project, called J’ai la mémoire qui tourne (My Memories On A Roll), caught the attention of the International Contest of Educational Programs in Japan, winning a nomination for the top prize. In 2011, Maroist and Ruel won a Pierre Berton award for this production - the highest distinction awarded by the Governor General of Canada for works on Canada's history, and the second time the award was given to Quebecers.

In 2014, Maroist and Eric Ruel released a documentary titled God Save Justin Trudeau, a critical examination of the role of showmanship in Canadian politics which raised troubling questions about the state of Canadian democracy. The film was nominated for 2015 Gemini Awards. Currently, the duo is working on a new TV series, Who We Are - a multi-platform multimedia documentary exploring 150 years of Canada's history through the eyes of generations of Canadians, using the pioneering "people’s history" methodology they developed for My Memories On A Roll.

In 2015, Maroist teamed up with Prof. Sergei Plekhanov of York University and the Canadian Pugwash Group to produce a documentary advocating the abolition of nuclear weapons. This documentary film project is the latest manifestation of Maroist's lifetime devotion to peace and environmentalist activism, reflected in her 1980s membership in Greenpeace, her journalistic work on Palestinian rights, her films on the nuclear dangers, and her leadership in Les Artistes pour la Paix, a Quebec NGO advocating peace and nuclear disarmament.

In 2022, Maroist and Léa Clermont-Dion released the documentary film Backlash: Misogyny in the Digital Age.

References

Living people
Canadian documentary film directors
Canadian women film directors
Year of birth missing (living people)
Canadian women documentary filmmakers